Riemenschneider is a crater on Mercury.  Its name was adopted by the International Astronomical Union (IAU) in 1979. Riemenschneider is named for the German sculptor Tilman Riemenschneider.

References

Impact craters on Mercury